The Nu Nation Project is the fifth studio album by Kirk Franklin. It is his final album in collaboration with The Family and God's Property, the first to feature One Nation Crew, and the only one to feature Nu Nation. Its sequel entitled "Something About the Name Jesus, Pt. 2" featuring Rance Allen, Marvin Winans, John P. Kee & Isaac Carree is on his 2011 album, Hello Fear. It was released on September 22, 1998, and won the 1998 Grammy Award for "Best Contemporary Soul Gospel Album".

Track listing

Personnel

Production
 Chris Bell – engineer

Vocalists
 Kirk Franklin – lead vocals
 Rodney Jerkins – rap vocals on "Revolution"
 Bono – lead vocals on "Lean on Me"
 Crystal Lewis – lead vocals on "Lean on Me"
 Mary J. Blige – lead vocals on "Lean on Me"
 R. Kelly – lead vocals on "Lean on Me"
 Rance Allen – lead vocals on "Something About the Name Jesus"
 Men of Standard – background vocals on "Something About the Name Jesus"
 Fred Hammond – lead vocals on "My Desire" 
 Donnie McClurkin – lead vocals on "Smile Again"
 James Henderson – lead vocals on "Gonna Be a Lovely Day" and "Smile Again"
 Lakiesha Grandy – lead vocals on "He Loves Me" and "Gonna Be a Lovely Day"
 Dalon Collins – lead vocals on "Lean on Me" and "Gonna Be a Lovely Day"
 Caltomeesh West – lead vocals on "Gonna Be a Lovely Day"
 Tamela Mann – lead vocals on "Lean on Me" and "Gonna Be a Lovely Day"
 The Family – background vocals on "Lean on Me", "Riverside", "He Loves Me", "You Are", "Blessing In The Storm", "My Desire", "I Can" and "Lovely Day"
 God's Property – background vocals on "Praise Joint (Remix)" and "Smile Again"
 One Nation Crew – background vocals on "Revolution"
 O.D. Wyatt High School Choir – background vocals on "If You've Been Delivered" and "My Desire''

Instrumentalists
Kirk Franklin – piano, programming
Bobby Sparks – keyboards, organ, piano, strings, programming, drum programming
Jerome Allen – bass
Mark Harper – lead guitar, acoustic guitar
Jerome Harmon – organ
Len Barrett – percussion
Erick J. Morgan – live drums
Dan Shea – piano, keyboards and rhythm programming on "Lean On Me"
Nathan East – bass on "Lean On Me"
Michael Landau – guitar On "Lean On Me"
Ricky Lawson – drums on "Lean On Me"
Jeremy Haynes – live drums on "Riverside"
Malcolm Robertson – trombone on "My Desire"
Skip Warren– trumpet on "My Desire"
Lee Charles Mitchell – tenor saxophone On "My Desire"
Jack Williams – trumpet on "My Desire"
Ref. Album credit notes

Chart performance

Weekly charts

Year-end charts

Certifications  

References

1998 albums
Kirk Franklin albums